The star height problem in formal language theory is the question whether all regular languages can be expressed using regular expressions of limited star height, i.e. with a limited nesting depth of Kleene stars. Specifically, is a nesting depth of one always sufficient? If not, is there an algorithm to determine how many are required?

Families of regular languages with unbounded star height
The first question was answered in the negative when in 1963, Eggan gave examples of regular languages of star height n for every n.

However, Eggan's examples use a large alphabet, of size 2n-1 for the language with star height n. He thus asked whether we can also find examples over binary alphabets.
Their examples can be described by an inductively defined family of regular expressions over the binary alphabet  as follows–cf. :
 

Again, a rigorous proof is needed for the fact that  does not admit an equivalent regular expression of lower star height.

Computing the star height of regular languages
In contrast, the second question turned out to be much more difficult, and the question became a famous open problem in formal language theory for over two decades . For years, there was only little progress. The pure-group languages were the first interesting family of regular languages for which the star height problem was proved to be decidable . But the general problem remained open for more than 25 years until it was settled by Hashiguchi, who in 1988 published an algorithm to determine the star height of any regular language. The algorithm wasn't at all practical, being of non-elementary complexity. To illustrate the immense resource consumptions of that algorithm, Lombardy and Sakarovitch (2002) give some actual numbers:

Notice that alone the number  has 10 billion zeros when written down in decimal notation, and is already by far larger than the number of atoms in the observable universe.

A much more efficient algorithm than Hashiguchi's procedure was devised by Kirsten in 2005. This algorithm runs, for a given nondeterministic finite automaton as input, within double-exponential space. Yet the resource requirements of this algorithm still greatly exceed the margins of what is considered practically feasible.

This algorithm has been optimized and generalized to trees by Colcombet and Löding in 2008 , as part of the theory of regular cost functions.
It has been implemented in 2017 in the tool suite Stamina.

See also
Generalized star height problem
Kleene's algorithm — computes a regular expression (usually of non-minimal star height) for a language given by a deterministic finite automaton

References

Works cited
 (technical report version)

Further reading

 

Automata (computation)
Formal languages
Theorems in discrete mathematics